Mallojula Venugopal, commonly known by his nom de guerre Abhay, is a Politburo and Central Military Commission member of the Communist Party of India (Maoist), a banned Maoist insurgent communist party in India.

Family
Venugopal is the younger brother of another Maoist guerrilla leader Kishenji. He was born into a poor family in Peddapalli in Karimnagar district, Telangana which eked out a living on priesthood in nearby temples. His grandfather and father Mallujola Venkataiyan both were Indian freedom fighters. Venugopal left home for more than 30 years after joining Left wing extremism. His wife Tara akka, also a maoist commander was killed in the encounter on 4 December 2018 along with Narmada Akka.

Activities 
Venugopal, a former Peoples War Group leader who is also known as Bhupati, Sonu, Master and Abhay was the Chief of the Maoist's Dandakaranya Special Zonal committee which includes Garchirouli area of state of Maharastra. He was appointed for formation of a new guerrilla zone in the South India which controls areas on either side of Western Ghats, from Goa to Idukki in Kerala. He was also deputed as the official spokesperson of CPI (Maoist) after the death of Cherukuri Rajkumar (Azad) in 2010. Venugopal took charge of publication division of the party. Police intelligence suspect he is one of the brains behind the April 2010 Maoist attack in Dantewada that killed 76 jawans of Central Reserve Police Force. Both Andhra Pradesh and Chhattishgarh Police have declared hefty amounts on his head. After the death of Kisenji, his party appointed him to lead Lalgarh area movement in West Bengal against Operation Green Hunt.

References 

Anti-revisionists
Communist Party of India (Maoist) politicians
Indian guerrillas
Indian Marxists
Naxalite–Maoist insurgency
People from Karimnagar district